ILCA may refer to:

 International Labor Communications Association, a US organization for trade union publications and media production departments
 ILCA, the designation for some Sony α camera models since 2013
 ILCA (I Love Computer Art), the developer of Pokémon Brilliant Diamond and Shining Pearl and One Piece Odyssey
 The International Laser Class Association, which defines the specifications of the Laser sailing dinghy
 ILCA 7, ILCA 6 or ILCA 4, the competition class designations for the dinghies known as the Laser Standard, Laser Radial and Laser 4.7, respectively
 International Livestock Centre for Africa

See also
ILC (disambiguation)
ILCE (disambiguation)